The internal classification of the Romance languages is a complex and sometimes controversial topic which may not have one single answer.  Several classifications have been proposed, based on different criteria.

Attempts at classifying Romance languages

Difficulties of classification
The comparative method used by linguists to build family language trees is based on the assumption that the member languages evolved from a single proto-language by a sequence of binary splits, separated by many centuries. With that hypothesis, and the glottochronological assumption that the degree of linguistic change is roughly proportional to elapsed time, the sequence of splits can be deduced by measuring the differences between the members.

However, the history of Romance languages, as we know it, makes the first assumption rather problematic. While the Roman Empire lasted, its educational policies and the natural mobility of its soldiers and administrative officials probably ensured some degree of linguistic homogeneity throughout its territory. Even if there were differences between the Vulgar Latin spoken in different regions, it is doubtful whether there were any sharp boundaries between the various dialects. On the other hand, after the Empire's collapse, the population of Latin speakers was separated—almost instantaneously, by the standards of historical linguistics—into a large number of politically independent states and feudal domains whose populations were largely bound to the land. These units then interacted, merged and split in various ways over the next fifteen centuries, possibly influenced by languages external to the family (as in the so-called Balkan language area).

In summary, the history of Latin and Romance-speaking peoples can hardly be described by a binary branching pattern; therefore, one may argue that any attempt to fit the Romance languages into a tree structure is inherently flawed. In this regard, the genealogical structure of languages forms a typical linkage.

On the other hand, the tree structure may be meaningfully applied to any subfamilies of Romance whose members did diverge from a common ancestor by binary splits.  That may be the case, for example, of the dialects of Spanish and Portuguese spoken in different countries, or the regional variants of spoken standard Italian (but not the so-called "Italian dialects", which are distinct languages that evolved directly from Vulgar Latin).

The standard proposal
Nevertheless, by applying the comparative method, some linguists have concluded that the earliest split in the Romance family tree was between Sardinian and the remaining group, called Continental Romance.  Among the many peculiar Sardinian distinguishing features are its articles (derived from Latin IPSE instead of ILLE) and retention of the "hard" sounds of "c" and "g" before "e" and "i". This view is challenged in part by the existence of definite articles continuing  forms (e.g. sa mar 'the sea') in some varieties of Catalan, best known as typical of Balearic dialects.

According to this view, the next split was between Romanian in the east, and the other languages (the Italo-Western languages) in the west. One of the characteristic features of Romanian is its retention of three of Latin's seven noun cases.  The third major split was more evenly divided, between the Italian branch, which comprises many languages spoken in the Italian Peninsula, and the Gallo-Iberian branch.

Another proposal
However, this is not the only view. Another common classification begins by splitting the Romance languages into two main branches, East and West. The East group includes Romanian, the languages of Corsica and Sardinia, and all languages of Italy south of a line through the cities of Rimini and La Spezia (see La Spezia–Rimini Line). Languages in this group are said to be more conservative, i.e. they retained more features of the original Latin.

The West group split into a Gallo-Romance group, which became the Oïl languages (including French), Gallo-Italian, Occitan, Franco-Provençal and Romansh, and an Iberian Romance group which became Spanish and Portuguese.

The wave hypothesis
Linguists like Jean-Pierre Chambon claim that the various regional languages did not evolve in isolation from their neighbours; on the contrary, they see many changes propagating from the more central regions (Italy and France) towards the periphery (Iberian Peninsula and Romania). These authors see the Romance family as a linkage rather than a tree-like family, and insist that the Wave model is better suited than the Tree model for representing the history of Romance.

Degree of separation from Latin
In a study by linguist Mario Pei (1949), the degrees of phonological modification of vowels of the Romance languages with respect to the ancestral Latin were found to be as follows
Sardinian: 8%
Italian: 12%
Spanish: 20%
Romanian: 23.5%
Occitan: 25%
Portuguese: 31%
French: 44%

Some major linguistic features differing among Romance languages
Part of the difficulties met in classifying Romance languages is due to the seemingly messy distribution of linguistic innovations across members of the Romance family. While this is a problem for followers of the dominant Tree model, this is in fact a characteristic typical of linkages and dialect continuums generally: this has been an argument for approaching this family with the tools based on the Wave model, including dialectology and Historical glottometry.

What follows is a sample of some significant linguistic traits (innovations since Vulgar Latin) that run across the Romance linkage.

The differences among Romance languages occur at all levels, including the sound systems, the orthography, the nominal, verbal, and adjectival inflections, the auxiliary verbs and the semantics of verbal tenses, the function words, the rules for subordinate clauses, and, especially, in their vocabularies. While most of those differences are clearly due to independent development after the breakup of the Roman Empire (including invasions and cultural exchanges), one must also consider the influence of prior languages in territories of Latin Europe that fell under Roman rule, and possible heterogeneity in Vulgar Latin itself.

Romanian, together with other related languages, like Aromanian, has a number of grammatical features which are unique within Romance, but are shared with other non-Romance languages of the Balkans, such as Albanian, Bulgarian, Greek, Macedonian, Serbo-Croatian and Turkish. These include, for example, the structure of the vestigial case system, the placement of articles as suffixes of the nouns ( = "sky",  = "the sky"), and several more. This phenomenon, called the Balkan language area, may be due to contacts between those languages in post-Roman times.

Formation of plurals

Some Romance languages form plurals by adding  (derived from the plural of the Latin accusative case), while others form the plural by changing the final vowel (by influence of Latin nominative plural endings, such as  ) from some  masculine nouns.
Plural in : Portuguese, Galician, Spanish, Catalan,  Occitan, Sardinian, Friulian, Romansh. 
Special case of French: Falls into the first group historically (and orthographically), but the final -s is no longer pronounced (except in liaison contexts), meaning that singular and plural nouns are usually homophonous in isolation. Many determiners have a distinct plural formed by both changing the vowel and allowing  in liaison.
Vowel change: Italian, Neapolitan, Sicilian, Romanian.

Words for "more"
Some Romance languages use a version of Latin plus, others a version of magis.
Plus-derived: French  , Italian  , Sardinian  , Piedmontese , Lombard , Ligurian , Neapolitan  Friulian , Romansh , Venetian . In Catalan   is exclusively used on negative statements in Mallorcan Catalan dialect, and "" is the word mostly used.

Words for "nothing"
Some argue that most roots derive from different parts of a Latin phrase nullam rem natam ("no thing born"), an emphatic idiom for "nothing". Meanwhile, Italian and Venetian niente and gnente would seem to be more logically derived from Latin ne(c) entem ("no being"), ne inde or, more likely, ne(c) (g)entem, which also explains the French cognate word néant. The Piedmontese negative adverb nen cames also directly from ne(c) (g)entem, while gnente is borrowed from Italian.

The number 16
Romanian constructs the names of the numbers 11–19 by a regular Slavic-influenced pattern that could be translated as "one-over-ten", "two-over-ten", etc. All the other Romance languages use a pattern like "one-ten", "two-ten", etc. for 11–15, and the pattern "ten-and-seven, "ten-and-eight", "ten-and-nine" for 17–19. For 16, however, they split into two groups: some use "six-ten", some use "ten-and-six":
"Sixteen": Italian sedici, Catalan and Occitan setze, French seize, Venetian sédexe, Romansh sedesch, Friulian sedis, Lombard sedas / sedes, Franco-Provençal sèze, Sardinian sèighi, Piedmontese sëddes (sëddes is borrowed from Lombard and replaced the original sëzze since the 18th century, such as the numbers from 11 to 16, onze but now óndes, dose but now dódes, trëzze but now tërdes, quatòrze but now quatòrdes, quinze but now quìndes).
"Ten and six": Portuguese dezasseis or dezesseis, Galician dezaseis (decem ac sex), Spanish dieciséis (romance construction: diez y seis), the Marchigiano dialect digissei.
"Six over ten": Romanian șaisprezece (where spre derives from Latin super).
Classical Latin uses the "one-ten" pattern for 11–17 (ūndecim, duodecim, ... , septendecim), but then switches to "two-off-twenty" (duodēvigintī) and "one-off-twenty" (ūndēvigintī). For the sake of comparison, note that many of the Germanic languages use two special words derived from "one left over" and "two left over" for 11 and 12, then the pattern "three-ten", "four-ten", ... , "nine-ten" for 13–19.

To have and to hold
The verbs derived from Latin habēre "to have", tenēre "to hold", and esse "to be" are used differently in the various Romance languages, to express possession, to construct perfect tenses, and to make existential statements ("there is"). If we use T for tenēre, H for habēre, and E for esse, we have the following distribution:
HHE: Romanian, Italian, Gallo-Italic languages.
HHH: Occitan, French, Romansh, Sardinian.
THH: Spanish, Catalan, Aragonese.
TTH: European Portuguese.
TTH/T-T: Brazilian Portuguese (colloquial; perfect tense is constructed with já + preterite).

For example:

Ancient Galician-Portuguese used to employ the auxiliary H for permanent states, such as Eu hei um nome "I have a name" (i.e. for all my life), and T for non-permanent states Eu tenho um livro "I have a book" (i.e. perhaps not so tomorrow), but this construction is no longer used in modern Galician and Portuguese. Informal Brazilian Portuguese uses the T verb even in the existential sense, e.g. Tem água no copo "There is water in the glass".

Languages that have not grammaticalised *tenēre have kept it with its original sense "hold", e.g. Italian tieni il libro, French tu tiens le livre, Romanian ține cartea, Friulian Tu tu tegnis il libri "You're holding the book". The meaning of "hold" is also retained to some extent in Spanish and Catalan.

Romansh uses, besides igl ha, the form i dat (literally: it gives), calqued from German es gibt.

To have or to be
Some languages use their equivalent of 'have' as an auxiliary verb to form the compound forms (e. g. French passé composé) of all verbs; others use 'be' for some verbs and 'have' for others.
'have' only: Standard Catalan, Spanish, Romanian, Sicilian.
'have' and 'be': Occitan, French, Sardinian, Italian, Northern-Italian languages (Piedmontese, Lombard, Ligurian, Venetian, Friulan), Romansh, Central Italian languages (Tuscan, Umbrian, Corsican) some Catalan dialects (although such usage is recessing in those).
In the latter type, the verbs which use 'be' as an auxiliary are unaccusative verbs, that is, intransitive verbs that often show motion not directly initiated by the subject or changes of state, such as 'fall', 'come', 'become'. All other verbs (intransitive unergative verbs and all transitive verbs) use 'have'. For example, in French, J'ai vu or Italian ho visto 'I have seen' vs. Je suis tombé, sono caduto 'I have (lit. am) fallen'. Note, however, the difference between French and Italian in the choice of auxiliary for the verb 'be' itself: Fr. J'ai été 'I have been' with 'have', but Italian sono stato with 'be'. In Southern Italian languages the principles governing auxiliaries can be quite complex, including even differences in persons of the subject. A similar distinction exists in the Germanic languages, which share a language area; German and the Scandinavian languages use 'have' and 'be', while modern English now uses 'have' only (although 'be' remains in certain relic phrases: Christ is risen, Joy to the world: the Lord is come).

"Be" is also used for reflexive forms of the verbs, as in French j'ai lavé 'I washed [something]', but je me suis lavé 'I washed myself', Italian ho lavato 'I washed [something]' vs. mi sono lavato 'I washed myself'.

Tuscan uses si forms identical to the 3rd person reflexive in a usage interpreted as 'we' subject, triggering 'be' as auxiliary in compound constructions, with the subject pronoun noi 'we' optional. If the verb employed is one that otherwise selects 'have' as auxiliary, the past participle is unmarked: si è lavorato = abbiamo lavorato 'we (have) worked'. If the verb is one that otherwise selects 'be', the past participle is marked plural: si è arrivati = siamo arrivati 'we (have) arrived'.

References 
 Chambon, Jean-Pierre. 2011. Note sur la diachronie du vocalisme accentué en istriote/istroroman et sur la place de ce groupe de parlers au sein de la branche romane. Bulletin de la Société de Linguistique de Paris 106.1: 293-303.
 .
 .

Notes 

Romance languages
Romance